Abacodes may refer to:
 Abacodes  Thomson, 1858, a genus of beetles in the family Carabidae, synonym of Buderes
 Abacodes Jeannel, 1948, a genus of beetles in the family Carabidae, synonym of Chaetodactyla